Alcyna kingensis, common name the King Island kelp shell, is a species of sea snail, a marine gastropod mollusk in the family Trochidae, the top snails.

Description
The size of the shell attains 3.5 mm.

Distribution
This marine species is endemic to Australia and occurs off  Tasmania.

References

Gabriel, C.J. 1956. Mollusca from southeast of King Island, Bass Strait. Memoirs of the National Museum, Melbourne 22(4): 1-15
Wilson, B. 1993. Australian Marine Shells. Prosobranch Gastropods. Kallaroo, Western Australia : Odyssey Publishing Vol. 1 408 pp.

External links
To World Register of Marine Species
Gastropods.com: Alcyna kingensis

kingensis
Gastropods of Australia
Gastropods described in 1956